Monoamine precursors are precursors of monoamines and monoamine neurotransmitters in the body. The amino acids L-tryptophan and L-5-hydroxytryptophan (5-HTP; oxitriptan) are precursors of serotonin and melatonin, while the amino acids L-phenylalanine, L-tyrosine, and L-DOPA (levodopa) are precursors of dopamine, epinephrine (adrenaline), and norepinephrine (noradrenaline). Administration of monoamine precursors can increase the levels of monoamine neurotransmitters in the body and brain. Monoamine precursors may be used in combination with peripherally selective aromatic L-amino acid decarboxylase inhibitors (AAAD inhibitors; also known as DOPA decarboxylase (DDC) inhibitors) such as carbidopa and benserazide. Carbidopa/levodopa is used to increase brain dopamine levels in the treatment of Parkinson's disease while carbidopa/oxitriptan (EVX-101) is under development as an antidepressant for possible use in the treatment of depression.

References

Amino acids
Dietary supplements
Prodrugs